Tabernaemontana pandacaqui, known as windmill bush and banana bush, is a species of plant in the dogbane family Apocynaceae.

Description
Its flowers feature white or pale yellow corolla lobes.

Distribution and habitat
Tabernaemontana pandacaqui is native to China, Taiwan, Thailand, Malesia, Papua New Guinea, Australia and many Pacific islands. It is found in a wide variety of habitats, particularly in drier areas. The species is also reportedly naturalized in the Windward Islands, Trinidad and Tobago and Panama.

References

pandacaqui
Flora of China
Flora of Thailand
Flora of Malesia
Flora of the Pacific
Flora of Australia
Plants described in 1806